Fudbalski klub Zvijezda 09 (Serbian Cyrillic: Фудбалски клуб Звијезда 09) is a professional association football club from the village of Brgule, near the city of Bijeljina, Republika Srpska that is situated in Bosnia and Herzegovina.

Zvijezda 09 currently plays in the First League of Republika Srpska, having previously played in the Premier League of Bosnia and Herzegovina before getting relegated in the 2019–20 Bosnian Premier League season. The club plays its home matches at the Ugljevik City Stadium, which has a capacity of 5,000 seats.

History 
Zvijezda 09 was founded in 2009, and have consistently risen through the football pyramid of Bosnia and Herzegovina.

They played in the seventh tier of football in the 2010–11 season, and then turned out in the country's Premier League with six promotions in eight years. In their first ever Bosnian Premier League season, the 2018–19 season, Zvijezda 09 finished on 9th place, escaping relegation. In the 2019–20 Bosnian Premier League season, the club got relegated back to the First League of RS after finishing in 12th place.

Honours

Domestic

League
First League of Republika Srpska:
Winners (1): 2017–18

Players

Current squad

Players with multiple nationalities
   Milivoje Lazić
   Igor Blagojević
   Goran Šujić
   Andrija Rajović

From youth team

Out on loan

Historical list of managers
 Mladen Obrenović (23 August 2016 – 14 June 2017)
 Mile Lazarević (15 June 2017 – 13 November 2017)
 Mladen Obrenović (14 November 2017 – 1 December 2017)
 Dragan Mićić (28 December 2017 – 26 February 2018)
 Miodrag Pantelić (26 February 2018 – 6 June 2018)
 Milan Đuričić (14 June 2018 – 4 September 2018)
 Darko Nestorović (5 September 2018 – 11 March 2019)
 Milenko Bošnjaković (18 March 2019 – 27 May 2019)
 Boris Savić (27 May 2019 – 31 August 2019)
 Slavoljub Bubanja (6 September 2019 – 6 October 2019)
 Adnan Zildžović (9 October 2019 – 9 March 2020)
 Perica Ognjenović (9 March 2020 – 19 June 2020)
 Zumbul Mahalbašić (20 June 2020 – 4 September 2020)
 Mladen Obrenović (4 September 2020 – 31 March 2021)

References

External links
FK Zvijezda 09 at Facebook

 
Association football clubs established in 2009
Zvijezda 09
Zvijezda 09
Bijeljina
2009 establishments in Bosnia and Herzegovina